Psalms is the debut studio album by American deathcore band Lorna Shore. It was released on June 9, 2015 through Density Records, their only album with the label, and was produced by Will Putney.

Critical reception

The album received mostly positive reviews from critics. KillYourStereo rated the album 3 out of 5 and said: "It would be going too far to say that Lorna Shore's Psalms is a bad album. All the successful elements of a deathcore album are there and they're executed skillfully. Unfortunately, the abundance of breakdowns that pop up literally stop the album in its tracks. With material from Aversions Crown and Black Tongue managing to showcase new elements in the genre, it's a shame that Lorna Shore fail to bring anything fresh to the table." New Noise gave the album a positive review but stated: "That's how most of these tracks feel. If you took out the breakdowns, or at least minimized their lengths, you would be left with one of, if not the best, deathcore bands around. Lorna Shore isn't just technically impressive; they try to write good, meaningful songs. However, when you stick in one or more drastic and unfortunate shifts in sound a song (i.e., breakdowns), you aren't great songwriters. If Lorna Shore can shore up further what makes them great (the horrifying mood, the musical ability), then deathcore could have a new shining star. As it stands, this is either a wonderfully competent breakdown-filled ride or a disappointment for what it could have been."

New Transcendence praised the album saying, "Lorna Shore have crafted a lurid, loathsome lesson in lacerating heavy music that bands of all styles and genres could learn from. With atmosphere and melody enough to appease fans of melo-death and sludge, but with raw, ruthless punch for those plotting to turn their parent's living room into a mosh pit, Psalms is pure punishment and infernal aggression that no prayer or person in the sky can save the listener from—that is, if they even want to be saved."

V13.net reviewer Daniella Kohan stated in an unrated review for the album, "New Jersey’s Lorna Shore is not a band for the faint of heart, and their first full-length offering, Psalms, follows in that same vein. Their unique genre-bending style of blackened technical deathcore really comes into its own on this album, maintaining consistency as well as an overpowering disposition for slow, chuggy breakdowns."

Track listing

Personnel
Credits adapted from AllMusic.

Lorna Shore
 Tom Barber – vocals
 Adam De Micco – lead guitar
 Connor Deffley – rhythm guitar
 Gary Herrera – bass
 Austin Archey – drums

Additional personnel
 Will Putney – production, mixing, mastering
 Tom Smith Jr. and Randy Leboeuf – engineering
 Steven Seid – editing
 Mike Mowery and Wayne Pighini – management
 Matt Andersen – booking
 JSS – art conception, layout

Charts

References

2015 debut albums
Lorna Shore albums